The Tulane Green Wave baseball team represents Tulane University in NCAA Division I college baseball. The Green Wave baseball team competes in the American Athletic Conference and play their home games on campus at Greer Field at Turchin Stadium. They are coached by head coach Jay Uhlman.

Tulane has captured 15 conference championships in three
different leagues and have made 21 NCAA Regional Appearances, including three Super Regionals and two trips to the College World Series.

History

By the numbers
103 - MLB Draft Picks
28 - All Americans
22 - Freshman All Americans
9 - Academic All Americans
27 - MLB players
15 - Conference Championships
9 - 1st Round draft picks
21 - NCAA Regional appearances
3 - NCAA Super Regional Appearances
2 - College World Series appearances

Early years (1893–1946)
Tulane played its first game during the 1893 season. It was a 10–2 victory over the Southern Athletic Club.

Early Modern era (1947–1974)
During this era, Tulane won the 1948 SEC championship. Tulane left the SEC after the 1966 season. The school's final SEC season marked a milestone in racial integration in the South when Stephen Martin, a walk-on who was attending the school on an academic scholarship, became the first African American to play any varsity sport in the SEC.

Joe Brockhoff era (1975–1993)
Under Joe Brockhoff, Tulane made seven NCAA Tournament appearances. His teams won one regular season and three tournament Metro Conference championships. Brockhoff finished with an overall record of 641–350–2 (.647) in his 19 seasons as head baseball coach.

Rick Jones era (1994–2014)
Rick Jones was hired as head baseball coach at Tulane in 1994. In 1996, Tulane played its first season as a founding member of Conference USA.

In 2001, the team's 55 wins set a school record and led the nation. The team made it to the College World Series in Omaha, only to blow an 8–0 lead against Stanford University and lose the game 13–11. The Green Wave won its next game against Nebraska 6–5 but was eliminated in the third game by Cal-State Fullerton.

In 2005, the Green Wave tied its 2001 record for wins. Tulane started the season ranked first in the nation and held the top spot throughout most of the regular season. The Green Wave entered the postseason ranked No. 1 and beat Rice to win its Super Regional. Tulane advanced to the College World Series for the second time in school history. The Green Wave defeated Oregon State 3–1 in its first game but fell 5–0 to Texas, the eventual national champion. In an elimination game against Baylor, the Green Wave led 7–0 in the 7th inning before the Bears scored 8 runs in the final three innings to win the game. Brian Bogusevic won Louisiana Pitcher of the Year, was named to four All-American teams (including Louisville Slugger's first team), and was a semifinalist for three national awards. He was taken in the first round of the 2005 draft by the Houston Astros. Pitcher and first baseman Micah Owings was named Conference USA and Louisiana Player of the Year. He was drafted in the third round by the Arizona Diamondbacks. Third baseman Brad Emaus was named Conference USA and Louisiana Freshman of the Year. Head Coach Rick Jones was named Louisiana Coach of the Year.

In 2006, the Tulane baseball team returned to New Orleans after spending the fall semester at Texas Tech University in Lubbock, Texas, due to the effects of Hurricane Katrina. With the renovation of Turchin Stadium delayed, the Green Wave were forced to play home games at nearby Zephyr Field for 2 seasons. Despite the distractions and disruptions of their day-to-day lives, the Green Wave finished the regular season 39–17, in third place in C-USA with a 15–9 conference record. Tulane lost to Ole Miss in the NCAA Regionals to end the season.

The university's Renewal Plan called for the suspension of some of its sports, and Tulane Athletics did not return to a full 16 teams until the 2011–12 school year.

Prior to the 2007 season the Green Wave was recognized by Baseball America as one of the top college baseball programs in the country since the NCAA expanded its tournament from 48 to 64 teams. The ratings were formulated by evaluating a program's national impact, overall competitiveness, fans and facilities, and academics. The Wave received an "A" rating, one of only 16 teams so designated.

The 2007 season saw the long-term effects of Hurricane Katrina finally wear on the team. With construction underway on the new Turchin Stadium, the Wave played a second straight season at Zephyr Field. A solid 28–11 start to the season (including a sweep of in-state rival LSU) was followed by a 6–15 limp to the finish line. The Green Wave failed to garner an NCAA bid for the first time since 1997.

In 2010, the NCAA named Tulane the 17th winningest team of the 2000s in terms of winning percentage and 16th by overall wins.

Due to health concerns in his 21st season as head coach, Rick Jones stepped down temporarily, handing over control of the 2014 team to recruiting coordinator and hitting coach Jake Gautreau. He was replaced by David Pierce. Jones finished with an overall record of 726–401–2 (.644) during his tenure as head coach for the Green Wave.

David Pierce era (2015–2016)
In his first year at Tulane in 2015, David Pierce brought the Green Wave back to postseason play for the first time since 2008. In 2016, he improved on that and Tulane won the American Athletic Conference championship. On June 29, 2016, Pierce left the Green Wave baseball program for the Texas Longhorns.

Travis Jewett era (2017–2022)
On July 14, 2016, Tulane hired Travis Jewett as head coach after a previous stint as an assistant coach at Vanderbilt.

On May 16, 2022, Tulane and Jewett agreed to mutually part ways effective immediately. Jay Uhlman was named interim head coach.

Jay Uhlman era (2022-present) 
On June 7, 2022, Tulane hired Jay Uhlman as head coach.

Traditions

Logo and uniforms
Tulane Baseball is widely regarded year in and year out as having one of the best logos and uniforms in College Baseball. Their jerseys feature two pelicans, Louisiana's state bird, perched on a baseball bat in the style of the St. Louis Cardinals logo. Throughout the years, multiple publications and fans have voted the Green Wave jerseys as having the #1 Logo and Uniform in college baseball, and as recently as 2016 the NCAA named it one of the top nine in the country.

Tulane's "birds on the bat" logo pays homage to the New Orleans Pelicans, a former minor league baseball team in New Orleans whose logo also borrowed from their parent club, the Cardinals.

Tulane has worn multiple color combinations throughout the years that include the following: olive green, sky blue, cream, white, gray, black, and padre style camo jerseys, all donning the famous Tulane "birds on the bat" logo. The baseball cap insignia features either the school's "Angry Wave" logo or the "Slugger Bird".

Stadium

The Green Wave have played its home games at Greer Field at Turchin Stadium since 1991. The team has a .750 winning percentage in games played there and consistently ranks highly among Division I baseball programs in average attendance figures. In 2008 the Green Wave returned to a brand-new Greer Field at Turchin Stadium, nearly rebuilt at the site of the old stadium after damage from Katrina forced the municipality to go with a much larger construction project. The new stadium expanded seating to 5,000, including four luxury box suites and a partially covered seating area with 2,700 chairback seats.

Head coaches

Year-by-year results

Tulane in the NCAA tournament
The NCAA Division I baseball tournament started in 1947. The format of the tournament has changed through the years.

Notable players

Retired numbers
The Tulane baseball program has retired three numbers in the school's history. One player, a player/coach and a coaching legend each have their names and numbers immortalized inside Greer Field at Turchin Stadium. A trio of New Orleans natives are all enshrined in the Tulane Athletics Hall of Fame, with head coach Joe Brockhoff (East Jefferson High School), Cary D. Livingston (West Jefferson High School) and Milt Retif (Jesuit High School) all have their numbers hung on the facade inside the Green Wave's home stadium.

Other prominent former players
Andrew Friedman
GM of the Tampa Bay Rays 2004–2014
2008 MLB Executive of the Year 
President of Baseball Operations, Los Angeles Dodgers 2014–present

Bobby Brown
4x World Series Champion
Cardiologist
Texas Rangers-Executive Vice President
President of the MLB American League (AL), 1984–1994
Presented World Series Trophy in 1992 and 1993
Last living member of 1947 New York Yankees World Series team

Scott Sidwell
Deputy athletic director at Penn State and former athletic director at the University of San Francisco

Player awards

National award winners

Conference award winners

Collegiate national team members
Over the last two decades, the Green Wave have been well represented on the nation's most elite team: USA Baseball's Collegiate National Team. Nine players/coaches have donned the red, white and blue uniform on eight separate occasions since Ivan Zweig became the first to represent Tulane as a member of Team USA in 1991.

"**"Indicates selected to team but did not participate due to injury

Tulane and MLB

By the numbers
Tulane players in MLB, all-time = 27
Most career home runs = 52 - Eddie Morgan
Most career strikeouts = 510 - Scott Williamson
Highest draft pick to reach MLB = Michael Aubrey - 11th overall pick, 2003
Lowest draft pick to reach MLB = Kevin Mmahat - 805th pick, 1987
Free agents to reach MLB = 5
Most Tulane MLB players in one season = 6 (2013)
Longest stretch of Tulane in MLB = 1978–present

Front office in MLB
Andrew Friedman, MLB general manager

See also

List of NCAA Division I baseball programs
Tulane Green Wave

References

External links